Zing Tsjeng (born 25 September 1988) is a Singaporean journalist, non-fiction author, and podcaster based in London. As of 2022, she is the editor in chief of Vice UK. She launched Broadly for the network in 2014.

Tsjeng published her four-installment book series Forgotten Women, profiling underrated historical women in various fields, in 2018 under Octopus Publishing.

In addition to Vice, Tsjeng has contributed to publications such as British Vogue, The Guardian, Dazed, Refinery29, AnOther, Harper's Bazaar UK, and Time Out London. She is a founder of the anti-harassment Unfollow Me campaign.

Early life and education
Tsjeng was born in Singapore. She moved to London at 16. She graduated with a Bachelor of Arts in Social and Political Sciences from the University of Cambridge in 2010. She developed an interest in journalism through the Cambridge student newspaper and interned at The Guardian and Diva, the latter of which she later became an editor for. She went on to graduate with a Master of Arts in Magazine Journalism from City, University of London in 2012.

Broadcasting

Presenting work 

 Empires of Dirt video series forVICE World News 
 My First Time sex and dating podcast for VICE
 United Zingdom for BBC Sounds 
 Obsessed with Killing Eve for BBC Sounds and BBC Three

Bibliography

Forgotten Women (2018)
Forgotten Women: The Scientists
Forgotten Women: The Leaders
Forgotten Women: The Writers

Essays
in In the Garden: Essays on Nature and Growing (2021)

Awards and recognition 

 Named one of London's most influential people in the Evening Standard Progress List 1000
 An LGBTQ trailblazer in Attitude magazine's Attitude 101 list
 Highly commended in the British Journalism Awards 2020

Personal life 
Tsjeng is technically eligible for British citizenship, but Singapore does not permit dual nationality, a topic Tsjeng covers in her BBC Sounds podcast United Zingdom. She is bisexual. Tsjeng is the owner of a kokoni spaniel cross named Judy who appeared on the cover of Time Out London magazine alongside UK Drag Race star Bimini Bom-Boulash in 2021.

References 

1988 births
Alumni of City, University of London
Alumni of the University of Cambridge
Bisexual journalists
Feminist writers
Singaporean LGBT journalists
Singaporean emigrants to the United Kingdom
Singaporean feminists
Singaporean non-fiction writers
Singaporean women journalists
Vice Media
Women podcasters
Living people